Karen J. Warren (September 10, 1947 – August 21, 2020) was an author, scholar, and former Professor and Chair of Philosophy at Macalester College.

Biography
Karen Warren received her B.A. in philosophy from the University of Minnesota (1970) and her Ph.D. from the University of Massachusetts-Amherst in 1978.
Before her long tenure at Macalester College, which began in 1985, Warren was Professor of Philosophy at St. Olaf College in the early 1980s. Warren was the Ecofeminist-Scholar-in-Residence at Murdoch University in Australia SelectedWorks - Karen Warren, Retired. In 2003, she served as an Oxford University Round Table Scholar and as Women's Chair in Humanistic Studies at Marquette University in 2004. She has spoken widely on environmental issues, feminism, critical thinking skills and peace studies in many international locations including Buenos Aires, Gothenburg, Helsinki, Oslo, Manitoba, Melbourne, Moscow, Perth, the U.N. Earth Summit in Rio de Janeiro (1992), and San Jose. Karen was diagnosed with Multiple System Atrophy (MSA) in 2016. Since that time, she worked to promote end of life options for individuals with terminal illnesses.  Using ethics as a philosophical framework, Karen argued that humans should have the right to choose when it is time to die when faced with an untreatable fatal illness. Karen articulated her arguments in public forums, including speaking in front of the Minnesota State Senate and writing articles for Compassion & Choices and Psychology Today.

Karen loved gardening, painting, being in nature, and cheering for her beloved MN Vikings. She loved animals—particularly her most recent cats Hypatia and Colfax. She is survived by a daughter (Cortney), son-in-law (Cal), two grandchildren (Isabella and Kane), two sisters (Janice and Barbara), a brother (Roger) and their respective families.

Karen donated her body to the University of Minnesota Anatomy Bequest Program for medical education and research. She was also a supporter of the Lou Ruvo Center for Brain Research and their work to understand Parkinson’s disease and MSA.

Public philosophy
Warren was a believer in allowing public access into the academic field of philosophy and described herself as a "street philosopher"Warren's Web Page. "I believe philosophy is relevant to people of all ages, in all cultural, geographical, and socioeconomic contexts,"EcoRes Forum: Press Release she said. Warren has taught philosophy in the Berkshire County House of Correction (MA), The Wilderness Society, Eco-Education, Pheasants Forever, Minnesota Naturalists Association and other organizations. As part of her commitment to public philosophy she has spoken for lay audiences and served as critical thinking consultant to the Science Museum of Minnesota and facilitator of a Women's Issues Book Group at Barnes & Noble Booksellers.

Publications
Warren has written extensively in the fields of critical thinking, environmental ethics and ecofeminism. She has written more than 40 articles and edited or co-edited five anthologies, authored Ecofeminist Philosophy: A Western Perspective on What It Is and Why It Matters (2000). She is the author of a groundbreaking anthology, An Unconventional History of Western Philosophy: Conversations Between Men and Women Philosophers (Rowman & Littlefield, 2009). The anthology explores 2600 years of Western philosophy, juxtaposing leading men and women philosophers' writing on ethics, metaphysics and other topics.
Her work has been translated into Spanish, Mandarin, French, Japanese and Persian.

References

External links
Wilderness Society
Amazon Book List
Third Space Book Review

1947 births
2020 deaths
University of Minnesota College of Liberal Arts alumni
American feminists
American non-fiction environmental writers
Ecofeminists
Macalester College faculty
American philosophers
21st-century American women writers
University of Massachusetts Amherst alumni
American women academics